Godzimierz  is a village in the administrative district of Gmina Szubin, within Nakło County, Kuyavian-Pomeranian Voivodeship, in north-central Poland.

The village has a population of 112.

It was formerly part of the Prussian Province of Posen, part of the Kreis Schubin.

References

Godzimierz